Liwa Ali al-Akbar (English: Ali al-Akbar Brigade) or as the Popular Mobilization Forces' 11th Brigade is an Iraqi Shiite faction part of the Popular Mobilization Forces and affiliated with the Imam Husayn Shrine in Karbala. It was formed after the fatwa of al-Jihad al-Kafa’i issued by Sayyid Ali al-Sistani and under the auspices of the Secretary General of the Hussaini Shrine, Sheikh Abdul Mahdi al-Karbalai. Abu Tahsin al-Salhi is also from the faction.

See also 

List of armed groups in the Iraqi Civil War
Private militias in Iraq

References

External links 
 
Liwa Ali al-Akbar :: Jihad Intel
http://al-hashed.net/tag/لواء-علي-الاكبر/ 
https://n.annabaa.org/tags/1371/
https://www.alalamtv.net/news/1896395/
"لواء علي الاكبر" يحرر منطقة البعيجي شمال تكريت بالكامل
http://www.alhikmeh.org/news/?p=143711

Popular Mobilization Forces
Shia Islamist groups
Arab militant groups
Anti-ISIL factions in Iraq
Jihadist groups in Iraq
Axis of Resistance